Jascha Akili Washington (born June 21, 1989) is an American actor and songwriter. Best known for Big Momma's House (2000), Big Momma's House 2 (2006), and Like Mike 2 (2006).

Life and career
Washington was born in Kings County, California, and debuted on television in 1997 on the episode "A Reverend Runs Through It" of the series Brooklyn South. He first appeared on film a year later as Will Smith's character's son Eric in Enemy of the State (1998). His notable film and television roles include an episode of The Suite Life of Zack & Cody as character Drew, Trent Pierce in Big Momma's House and its sequel in a cameo role, Dr. Gideon's son Eli on Gideon's Crossing, and as Jerome in Like Mike 2: Streetball (2006). He guest-starred on The Bernie Mac Show episode "It's a Wonderful Wife" and in the series House M.D. in the episode "Family" in 2007.

Washington presented a project The Final at After Dark Horrorfest 2010.

His most recent appearance was Kendall in Frenemies.

Besides his over a dozen films he has worked in television movies, shows, music videos and even appeared in a handful of commercials.

Washington did not appear in Big Mommas: Like Father, Like Son as Trent, the role he played in the first two films.

In August 2013, Washington welcomed a baby girl into his family, and in March 2015 his second child, a boy was born.

In January 2017, his third child, a boy, was born.

Filmography

Film

Television

References

External links

1989 births
Living people
20th-century American male actors
21st-century American male actors
People from Kings County, California
African-American male actors
Male actors from California
American male child actors
American male film actors
American male television actors
American male voice actors
Black Canadian male actors
20th-century African-American people
21st-century African-American people